Chistopolsky (masculine), Chistopolskaya (feminine), or Chistopolskoye (neuter) is the name of several rural localities in Russia:
Chistopolsky, Kemerovo Oblast, a settlement in Pervomayskaya Rural Territory of Mariinsky District of Kemerovo Oblast
Chistopolsky, Saratov Oblast, a settlement in Krasnopartizansky District of Saratov Oblast